Pokémon: Adventures in the Orange Islands (originally aired simply as Pokémon) is the second season of Pokémon, and the second season of Pokémon: The Original Series, known in Japan as Pocket Monsters: Episode Orange Archipelago (ポケットモンスター：オレンジ諸島編, Poketto Monsutā: Orenji Shotō Hen). It originally aired in Japan from January 28 to October 7, 1999, on TV Tokyo, in South Korea from June 15 to October 9, 2000, on Seoul Broadcasting System, and in the United States from December 4, 1999, to October 14, 2000, on The WB/Kids’ WB!, and it airing from January 8, to February 23, 2001, on Comedy Central. The show made its Indian debut on Cartoon Network from September 14, 2003, and ended its run in mid-2004.

This season, the narrator of the Pokémon anime (voiced in English by Rodger Parsons and in Japanese by Unshō Ishizuka) will follow the adventures of the ten-year-old Pokémon trainer Ash Ketchum (voiced in English by Veronica Taylor and in Japanese by Rika Matsumoto) and his electric mouse partner Pikachu (voiced by Ikue Ōtani) as they collect Gym Badges in the Orange Archipelago, also known as the Orange Islands, so they can compete in the Orange League competition.

The episodes were directed by Masamitsu Hidaka and produced by the animation studio Oriental Light and Magic.



Episode list

Music
The Japanese opening song is "The Rivals" (ライバル！, Raibaru) by Rika Matsumoto for all 36 episodes. The ending songs are "Type: Wild" (タイプ：ワイルド, Taipu: Wairudo) by Rika Matsumoto for 24 episodes, "Pokémon March" (ポケモン音頭, Pokémon Ondo) by Sachiko Kobayashi, Unshō Ishizuka and Kōichi Sakaguchi with an interlude by Shimai Niitsu for 1 episode, "Riding on Lapras" (ラプラスにのって, Rapurasu ni Notte) by Mayumi Iizuka and Rikako Aikawa for 12 episodes, and the English opening songs are "Pokémon Theme" by Jason Paige for 3 episodes. Its shortened version serves as the ending theme, and "Pokémon World" by Russell Velázquez for 33 episodes and for all 36 episodes. Its shortened version serves as the ending theme. The ending songs at the end of the episode are "My Best Friends" by Michael Whalen for 6 episodes, "Double Trouble" by Rachael Lillis, Eric Stuart, and Maddie Blaustein for 6 episodes, "What Kind of Pokémon Are You?" by Joshua Tyler for 4 episodes, "Together Forever" by J.P. Hartmann for 7 episodes, "2.B.A. Master" by Russell Velázquez for 9 episodes, and "Viridian City" by Jason Paige for 7 episodes from Pikachu's Jukebox. Johto predicted the English version of "Type: Wild", the ending song from Pokémon Encore performed by Robbie Danzie.

Home media releases
In the United States, the entire season was released on three 12-episode DVD volume sets in 2002 and 2003 by Viz Video and Ventura Distribution.

Viz Media released a box set containing all three DVDs in 2008.

Viz Media and Warner Home Video released Pokémon: Adventures in the Orange Islands – The Complete Collection on DVD in the United States on October 11, 2016.

Older home video releases refer to the season as Pokémon: Adventures on the Orange Islands. Newer DVD releases and the official Pokémon website refer to the season as Pokémon: Adventures in the Orange Islands.

References

External links
 
  at TV Tokyo 
  at Pokémon JP official website 

1999 Japanese television seasons
Season02